Ensign O'Toole is an American situation comedy that stars Dean Jones in the title role as an officer aboard the United States Navy destroyer USS Appleby in the early 1960s. It aired from 1962 to 1963.

Synopsis
Ensign O'Toole is a junior officer aboard the fictional destroyer USS Appleby in the peacetime United States Navy  of the early 1960s. Also aboard the Appleby are the ship's executive officer, Lieutenant Commander Virgil Stoner; its supply officer, the rich and usually befuddled Lieutenant (junior grade) Rex St. John; and an assortment of zany crewmen, including Chief Petty Officer Homer Nelson — who always seems to be in search of a poker game and often butts heads with O'Toole — and Seamen Gabby Di Julio, Howard Spicer, and Claude White. The nonchalant O'Toole is clever, speaks several languages, can answer any trivia question, and expresses expertise in almost any subject that comes up, but avoids doing work, preferring to spend his time pulling pranks and showing up the ambitious and overbearing St. John, usually with the enthusiastic help of the crew. The Appleby′s commanding officer never appears on camera; usually Lieutenant Commander Stoner relays his orders to the crew, although sometimes the commanding officer's voice is heard over the ship's "squawk box."

Cast
 Dean Jones .... Ensign O'Toole
 Jay C. Flippen .... Chief Petty Officer Homer Nelson
 Jack Mullaney .... Lieutenant (junior grade) Rex St. John
 Jack Albertson .... Lieutenant Commander Virgil Stoner
 Harvey Lembeck .... Seaman Gabby Di Julio
 Beau Bridges .... Seaman Howard Spicer
 Bob Sorrells .... Seaman Claude White
 Stuart Margolin .... Lieutenant Miller (recurring)
 Skip Ward .... Lieutenant Ferguson (recurring)
 Ken Berry .... Lieutenant Melton (recurring)
 Gerald Trump .... Crump (recurring)
 Andrew Colmar .... Naismith (recurring)
 Eddie Peterson ....Selby (recurring)

Production

Ensign O'Toole was based on two books — All the Ships at Sea (1950) and Ensign O'Toole and Me (1957) — by William Lederer, who served as consultant for the series. The destroyer  portrayed the fictional USS Appleby.

Broadcast history

Ensign O'Toole premiered on NBC on September 23, 1962. It lasted a single season, and the last of its 32 original episodes aired on May 5, 1963. Prime-time reruns of Ensign O'Toole followed in its regular time slot on NBC until September 15, 1963. The show aired at 7:00 p.m. on Sunday throughout its run.

From March to September 1964, ABC ran prime-time reruns of Ensign O'Toole at 9:00 p.m. on Thursday. The last of these aired on September 10, 1964 before Bewitched took its time slot the following week.

Episodes
SOURCES

References

External links

Ensign O'Toole opening credits on YouTube
Ensign O'Toole episode "Operation: Benefit" on YouTube
Ensign O'Toole episode "Operation: Jinx" on YouTube
Ensign O'Toole episode "Operation: Casanova" on YouTube
Ensign O'Toole episode "Operation: Arctic" on YouTube
Opening from Ensign O'Toole episode "Operation: Daddy" on YouTube
Excerpt from Ensign O'Toole episode "Operation: Mess" on YouTube
Images from Ensign O'Toole on YouTube

1962 American television series debuts
1963 American television series endings
1960s American sitcoms
Black-and-white American television shows
English-language television shows
Military comedy television series
Military humor in film
American military television series
Nautical television series
Television series about the United States Navy
Television series set in the 1960s